2000 Rugby League World Cup qualifying was contested by the national rugby league football teams of Lebanon, the United States, Morocco, Canada, Italy and Japan for the 16th spot in the 2000 Rugby League World Cup tournament. Lebanon won the tournament and went on to the World Cup.

Qualified teams

 (automatic qualifier)
 (automatic qualifier)
 (automatic qualifier)
 (automatic qualifier)
 (automatic qualifier)
 (automatic qualifier)
 (automatic qualifier)
 (automatic qualifier)
 (automatic qualifier and co-host)
 (automatic qualifier and co-host)
 (automatic qualifier and co-host)
 (automatic qualifier and co-host)
 (automatic qualifier and co-host)
 (automatic qualifier)
 (automatic qualifier)
 (winner of the qualifying group)

First round

Pool A
The first pool of World Cup qualifiers involved teams from the Mediterranean; Lebanon, Italy and Morocco. These matches were held in France.

Pool B

The second pool of World Cup qualifiers involved teams from the Pacific Rim; United States, Japan and Canada. Pool B qualifiers were held in Orlando, Florida, United States.

Second round

References

1999 in rugby league
Qualifying
1999 in Lebanese sport
1999 in Italian sport
1999 in Moroccan sport
1999 in American sports
1999 in Japanese sport
1999 in Canadian sports
International sports competitions hosted by Morocco